Beautiful Awakening is the third studio album by American singer Stacie Orrico. It was first released internationally on August 14, 2006, and marked the singer's debut with Virgin Records following her transition from ForeFront Records. Conceived during a longer hiatus during which Orrico returned to Seattle and took a waitressing job at a seafood restaurant after bouts with exhaustion following her international breakthrough with her self-titled second album (2003) and subsequent touring, the singer consulted a variety of musicians to work with her on new material. The songs, crafted along with frequent collaborators such as Dallas Austin and Anthony Dent as well as Dwayne Bastiany, KayGee, Novel, She'kspere, and Track & Field, took Orrico's work further away from the teen pop and more into R&B-Pop genre.

Upon its release, the album received generally positive reviews from critics who complimented Orrico on her vocal talent and her pop charisma displayed on Beautiful Awakening, though some felt that it lacked musical growth. Commercially, the album was less successful than her previous album Stacie Orrico (2003), though it reached the top ten on the Japanese Albums Chart and was certified gold by the Recording Industry Association of Japan (RIAJ). "I'm Not Missing You," the album's lead single, became a top 20 hit in Belgium, the Czech Republic, New Zealand, and Scotland. A second single, "So Simple," failed to chart. In the United States, Beautiful Awakening was released on January 16, 2007, in limited quantities but was quickly pulled as Virgin folded into EMI.

Background
In 2003, Orrico's career exploded when "Stuck" and "(There's Gotta Be) More to Life", the first two singles from her self-titled second album, became international top ten hits. Overwhelmed by the global success, the singer soon found herself on the hectic music business treadmill and, instead of continue recording, opted to return to her family in Seattle and took a waitressing job at a neighborhood seafood restaurant. During her hiatus, Orrico began writing new material and wound up with 55 new songs.

Singles
"I'm Not Missing You" was released as the album's lead single on August 5, 2006. The song charted at number 19 on the Bubbling Under Hot 100 Singles chart, an extension of the twenty-five songs that failed to make the Billboard Hot 100. Its accompanying music video was directed by Diane Martel.

Orrico re-shot the video for release in the U.S. and Canada. It was directed by the husband-wife directing team Honey. The redone video is about Orrico being happy about not being attached to anyone. Unlike the original version, Orrico provided all of her own wardrobe. The video premiered on Yahoo! Music on December 6, 2006. The song, as well as Stacie, is featured as one of iTunes' 39 Girls of Summer.

"So Simple" was the second single for Europe and Asia released on January 26, 2007, in Europe and Australia at around the same time having been released in Southeast Asia in October 2006. The video for "So Simple" was directed by Ray Kay and was shot in Calabasas, California between the 8 and 9 of September 2006. Kay premiered "So Simple" online towards the end of October 2006 on YouTube.

Critical reception

Beautiful Awakening received generally mixed to positive reviews. Billboard critic Chuck Taylor called the album "a majestic follow-up and the best blue-eyed soul this side of Motown." He felt that it "percolates with confidence and plentiful momentum" and noted that the album "has a definable signature throughout as if Orrico is performing the set live before your eyes. There are many highlights." Mike Rimmer, writing for Cross Rhythms, found that the album was "packed with the R&B pop that is so familiar of her style, all topped by her excellent voice [..] As always Orrico is superb vocally [...] Whilst not as immediate and poppy as her last release, this new slightly more mature approach suits her just fine."

AllMusic editor Stephen Thomas Erlewine gave a positive review. He found that he album finds "Orrico not only delivering more of the R&B soaked pop she perfected on her 2003 self-titled sophomore effort, but also maturing as an artist and a woman. Only 17 when she released her previous album, Orrico owns her womanhood here, focusing on such subjects as falling love and keeping true to yourself [...] These are heartfelt, hummable and sometimes funky tracks that truly showcase Orrico's growing vocal talent and pop charisma." Andree Farias form Christianity Today found that he album lacked "musical growth" and called it "a mild disappointment considering the potential Orrico showed" before. He remarked that "a couple of these songs are some of Orrico's most inspired, self-reflective performances to date [but] by comparison, though, the rest is all lighthearted stuff. Some of it is even silly, teen-crush fare."

Chart performance
Beautiful Awakening failed to reprise the success of Orrico's self-titled previous album (2003). It reached the top ten on the Japanese Albums Chart, peaking at number 8, and reached the top 20 on the UK R&B Albums chart, peaking at number 15. It also entered the top 40 of the Swiss Albums Chart.

Track listing

Sample credits
 "So Simple" contains a sample from "Doo Wop (That Thing)" as performed by Lauryn Hill.
 "Take Me Away" contains a sample from "On My Way Home to You" as performed by Michael Franks.
 "Is It Me" contains a sample from "A Garden of Peace" as performed by Lonnie Liston Smith and "Dead Presidents II" as performed by Jay-Z.

Production
Credits adapted from AllMusic.

Terence "Tramp Baby" Abney – producer
Dallas Austin – producer
 Dwayne Bastiany – engineer, instrumentation, producer, programming
Yvan Bing – assistant engineer
Dawn Boonyachlito – stylist
Lashaunda "Babygirl" Carr – producer
Anthony Dent – engineer, instrumentation, producer, programming
Rob Herrera – engineer
Chris Jenkins – assistant engineer
KayGee – producer
Carlton Lynn – engineer, mixing
Graham Marsh – assistant engineer
Novel – producer
Stacie Orrico – creative director, producer, vocal producer
Tiffany Palmer – vocal producer
Herb Powers – mastering
Greg Price – mixing
Carlos Ricketts – vocal producer
Michelle Ryang – A&R
She'kspere – producer
Rick Sheppard – engineer, sound design
Track & Field – producer
Trendsettas – producer
The Underdogs – producer
Josh Wilbur – engineer, mixing

Charts

Certifications

Release history

References

2006 albums
2007 albums
Albums produced by KayGee
Albums produced by Dallas Austin
Albums produced by the Underdogs (production team)
ForeFront Records albums
Stacie Orrico albums
Virgin Records albums